HD 1606 is a single star in the northern constellation of Andromeda, positioned a few degrees to the northeast of the bright star Alpheratz. It has a blue-white hue and is dimly visible to the naked eye with an apparent visual magnitude of 5.87. Although it is suspected of variability, none has been conclusively found. It has an absolute magnitude of −0.5.

This is a B-type main-sequence star with a stellar classification of B7V, which means it is currently generating energy through hydrogen fusion at its core. It has 3.75 times the mass of the Sun and a fairly high rate of spin, showing a projected rotational velocity of 113 km/s. The star is radiating 245 times the luminosity of the Sun from its photosphere at an effective temperature of 13,186 K.

References

B-type main-sequence stars
Suspected variables
Andromeda (constellation)
Durchmusterung objects
001606
001630
0078